Damasi is a village and a community of the Tyrnavos municipality. Before the 2011 local government reform it was a part of the municipality of Tyrnavos. The 2011 census recorded 1,380 inhabitants in the village and 1,444 inhabitants in the municipal unit. The community of Damasi covers an area of 143.35 km2. In the territory of Damasi lies the site of the ancient city of Phalanna.

Administrative division
The community of Damasi consists of two settlements:
Damasi (population (1,380)
Damasouli (population 64)

Population
According to the 2011 census, the population of the settlement of Damasi was 1,380 people, an increase of almost 1% compared with the population of the previous census of 2001.

See also
 List of settlements in the Larissa regional unit

References

Populated places in Larissa (regional unit)
Tyrnavos